Good Cheer is a 1926 American short silent comedy film directed by Robert F. McGowan. It was the 46th Our Gang short subject released.

Plot
As described in a film magazine review, the Gang is assembled in front of a big store window where a Santa Claus is doing his stuff. With the exception of two of the older members of the Gang who are entirely disillusioned as to the reality of the benevolent Old Man, the rest of the youngsters are very much impressed by the performance. The store window curtain is then pulled down but after a few minutes accidentally flies up to disclose a fake Santa Claus. The children disperse, muttering "There ain't no Santa Claus." However, Mickey and his pal decide to attempt to restore the faith of their friends but are hampered by a lack of funds. They then hit on the scheme of selling hot bricks to all who happen to be out in a terrific snow storm and manage to obtain a pocket full of money. Christmas presents are manufactured and they start on a midnight trip to visit various chimneys. At the same time a big bootlegging plot is being carried out and the conspirators are all disguised in Santa Clause costumes. The Gang assists in the capture of the crooks and everything turns out well for them.

Cast

The Gang
 Joe Cobb as Joe
 Jackie Condon as Jackie
 Mickey Daniels as Mickey
 Johnny Downs as Johnny
 Allen Hoskins as Farina
 Mary Kornman as Mary
 Jay R. Smith as J.R.
 Jannie Hoskins as Arnica
 David Durand as Mary's little brother
 Pal the Dog as Himself
 Dinah the Mule as Herself

Additional cast
 Jack Ackroyd as Crooked Santa
 Chet Brandenburg as Pedestrian / Crooked Santa
 Ed Brandenburg as Store window assistant
 Richard Daniels as Old man
 Jack Gavin as Crooked Santa
 Charlie Hall as Motorist / Crooked Santa
 Al Hallett as Crooked Santa
 Jack Hill - Pedestrian
 Wallace Howe as Crooked Santa
 Sam Lufkin as Inebriated Santa Claus
 Jules Mendel as Crooked Santa
 Gene Morgan as First officer
 William Orlamond as Crooked Santa
 'Tonnage' Martin Wolfkeil as Store window Santa
 Noah Young as Second officer

See also
 Our Gang filmography

References

External links

1926 films
1926 comedy films
1926 short films
American silent short films
American black-and-white films
Films directed by Robert F. McGowan
Hal Roach Studios short films
Our Gang films
1920s American films
Silent American comedy films